Wattle Grove is a rural locality in the local government area of Huon Valley in the South-east region of Tasmania. The 2016 census has a population of 117 for the state suburb of Wattle Grove.

History
Wattle Grove was gazetted as a locality in 1971.

Geography
The shore of the Huon River estuary forms the western boundary.

Road infrastructure
The C639 route (Cygnet Coast Road) enters from the north-west and follows the Huon River to the south-west, where it exits. Route C640 (Wattle Grove Road) starts at an intersection with C639 in the west and runs east and north-east through the locality until it exits. Route C646 (Forsters Rivulet Road) starts at an intersection with C640 and runs east until it exits.

References

Localities of Huon Valley Council
Towns in Tasmania